Joseph Demarius "Jody" Fortson Jr. (born December 7, 1995) is an American football tight end for the Kansas City Chiefs of the National Football League (NFL). He played college football at Valdosta State after transferring from Erie Community College, and was signed by the Chiefs as an undrafted free agent in 2019. Fortson has won two Super Bowls, Super Bowl LIV as a member of the Chiefs practice squad, and Super Bowl LVII while on the active roster.

College career 
Fortson began his college football career at Erie Community College before transferring to Valdosta State. A wide receiver in college, Fortson tallied 37 receptions for 477 yards and 7 touchdowns in 19 games played for the Valdosta State Blazers.

Despite an abbreviated senior season due to injury in which the Blazers won the Division II National Championship, Fortson was chosen to play in both the Tropical Bowl as well as the College Gridiron Showcase all-star events.

Professional career

Going into the NFL, Fortson converted to tight end and signed with the Kansas City Chiefs as an undrafted free agent on May 13, 2019. He was waived on August 31, 2019, and signed to the practice squad the next day. Fortson remained on practice squad for the rest of the season and as the Chiefs won Super Bowl LIV against the San Francisco 49ers. He re-signed with the Chiefs on February 5, 2020. He was waived on September 5, 2020. He signed to the practice squad the following day.

On February 9, 2021, Fortson re-signed with the Chiefs. He made the Chiefs' active roster on August 31, 2021.

He recorded his first career NFL reception against the Baltimore Ravens in Week 2 of the 2021 season. He recorded his first career NFL touchdown reception the following week against the Los Angeles Chargers. He was placed on injured reserve on October 23. He was placed on Reserve/COVID-19 on December 10, 2021. On the season, he appeared in six games and had five receptions for 47 yards and two touchdowns.

Fortson appeared in 13 games and had nine receptions for 108 yards and two touchdowns in the 2022 season. Fortson won his second Super Bowl when the Chiefs won Super Bowl LVII against the Philadelphia Eagles.

Fortson, who was an exclusive rights free agent, was tendered by the Chiefs on March 14, 2023. His contract for the 2023 season will be a one-year league minimum contract.

Career statistics

References

External links

Kansas City Chiefs bio
Valdosta State Blazers bio

1995 births
Living people
Players of American football from Buffalo, New York
American football wide receivers
Valdosta State Blazers football players
Kansas City Chiefs players
American football tight ends